Sir Joshua Strange Williams (19 September 1837 – 22 December 1915) was a New Zealand lawyer, politician, Supreme Court judge and university chancellor.

Early life
Williams was born in London, England in 1837, the eldest son of the late Joshua Williams, Q.C., author of treatises on the law relating to real and personal property and other works, by his marriage with Lucy, daughter of William Strange, of Upton. Williams was educated at Harrow and Trinity College, Cambridge, where he graduated B.A. (Chancellor's Medallist for legal studies, first class law tripos, third class mathematical tripos) in 1859, M.A. in 1862, and LL.M. in 1870. Williams entered at Lincoln's Inn in January 1857, and was called to the English Bar in November 1859.

New Zealand
He arrived in Dunedin, New Zealand in 1861 on the Derwentwater, moved to Christchurch almost immediately, and in the following year went into partnership with Thomas Smith Duncan, then provincial solicitor, an office which he himself subsequently held for several years.

Williams sat in the Canterbury Provincial Council representing the Heathcote electorate in 1862 and 1863 and from 1866 to 1871. He was on the provincial executive council in 1863, in 1866, and in 1867–1868. On 9 July 1873 at the first meeting of the Board of Governors of the Canterbury College, he was voted chairman after Charles Bowen had declined the role in advance of the meeting. Williams held the chairmanship until 1875, when he moved to Otago.

In January 1871 he gave up practice and was land registrar of the Canterbury district until 1872 and Registrar-General of Land for the whole of New Zealand from the latter year until 1875, in which year he was appointed puisne judge for Otago.  He was created a knight bachelor in 1911.

He married first, in 1864, Catherine Helen, daughter of Thomas Sanctuary, of Horsham, Sussex; and secondly, in 1877, Amelia Durant, daughter of John Wesley Jago, of Dunedin.

Arms

Notes

References

1837 births
1915 deaths
Lawyers from London
19th-century New Zealand lawyers
English emigrants to New Zealand
Members of the Canterbury Provincial Council
High Court of New Zealand judges
People educated at Harrow School
Alumni of Trinity College, Cambridge
Chancellors of the University of Canterbury
Members of Canterbury provincial executive councils
Colony of New Zealand judges
New Zealand members of the Privy Council of the United Kingdom
Members of the Judicial Committee of the Privy Council
19th-century English lawyers
Chancellors of the University of Otago